is a Japanese football player.

Club statistics
Updated to end of 2018 season.

National team statistics

References

External links
 Profile at Oita Trinita
 Profile at V-Varen Nagasaki
 
 
 
 Japan National Football Team Database

1990 births
Living people
National Institute of Fitness and Sports in Kanoya alumni
Association football people from Fukuoka Prefecture
Japanese footballers
Japan international footballers
J1 League players
J2 League players
Sagan Tosu players
Matsumoto Yamaga FC players
V-Varen Nagasaki players
Oita Trinita players
Montedio Yamagata players
Association football defenders
Tatsuya Sakai
Tatsuya Sakai
Japanese expatriate sportspeople in Thailand
Expatriate footballers in Thailand